Cold stamping, also known as press working, is a manufacturing operation in which thermoplastics in sheet form are cold-formed using methods similar to those used in metalworking. A precut thermoplastic sheet, possibly reinforced, is softened by heating to a temperature particular to the plastic in use. The heated sheet is then shaped by stamping using a press.

References 

Thermoplastics